Count of Almedina is a Portuguese title of nobility created on 13 April 1882 by Louis I of Portugal.

Delfim Deodato Guedes, 1st Count of Almedina
Luísa Guimarães Guedes, 2nd Countess of Almedina
Alda de Guimarães Guedes, 3rd Countess of Almedina
José Guedes Pinto Machado, 4th Count of Almedina
José Frederico Mayer Pinto Machado, 5th Count of Almedina

Almedina
1882 establishments in Portugal